Pelenda Joshua Tunga Dasilva (born 23 October 1998) is an English professional footballer who plays as a midfielder for  club Brentford. He is a graduate of the Arsenal Hale End Academy and was capped by England at youth level.

Club career

Arsenal 
Dasilva began his career with Arsenal and joined the club's Hale End academy at the age of eight. He progressed through the ranks and moved from left wing to forward, before settling into a box-to-box midfield role, under the guidance of Thierry Henry and Kwame Ampadu. After scoring 28 goals during the first year of his scholarship, he signed his first professional contract in August 2015 and was an unused substitute for the first team on two occasions during the 2016–17 season. Dasilva was an unused substitute on seven occasions during the first half of the 2017–18 season and made three appearances, all in EFL Cup matches. Despite progressing into the U23 team, Dasilva failed to see a pathway into the first team squad turned down a new contract at the end of the 2017–18 season. He was released on 30 June 2018.

Brentford

2018–19 
On 21 August 2018, Dasilva joined Championship club Brentford on a four-year contract, with the option of an further year, on a free transfer. After overcoming some fitness issues, he made his debut as a substitute for Josh McEachran late in a 2–0 win over Millwall on 3 November 2018. Either side of the New Year, Dasilva made sporadic substitute appearances in league matches and made two FA Cup starts, before breaking into the starting lineup in March 2019. On 19 April 2019, he scored the first senior goal of his career in the return match versus Millwall, with "an unstoppable curling effort into the top corner from 30 yards", which saved a 1–1 draw. Dasilva finished the 2018–19 season with 21 appearances and one goal.

2019–20 
After beginning the 2019–20 season in a substitute role, Dasilva heeded head coach Thomas Frank's call to up his workrate and intensity. He subsequently broke into the starting lineup in early October 2019 and came into form, scoring six goals in a 10-match spell, which included the first hat-trick of his career in a 7–0 win over Luton Town on 30 November. His November 2019 performances saw him nominated for the EFL Championship Player of the Month award. By the time Brentford's season ended with defeat in the 2020 Championship play-off Final, Dasilva had made 47 appearances and scored 10 goals.

2020–21 
During the 2020–21 season, after seven appearances and two goals, Dasilva signed a new four-year contract on 4 October 2020. His performance and goal in a 1–0 EFL Cup quarter-final victory over Premier League club Newcastle United on 22 December was recognised with a place in the EFL Cup Team of the Round. In the following round versus Tottenham Hotspur, Dasilva was sent off for the first time in his senior career after receiving a straight red card for a challenge on Pierre-Emile Højbjerg. By the time his season was ended by a hip injury in late February 2021, Dasilva had made 35 appearances and scored seven goals. In his absence, Brentford were promoted to the Premier League after victory in the 2021 Championship play-off Final.

2021–22 
Having spent four of the previous six months on crutches, Dasilva was left off Brentford's 25-man Premier League squad for the first half of the 2021–22 season. After the window transfer window closed, he was named in the club's updated 25-man Premier League squad. Following two behind closed doors friendly appearances, Dasilva made his first competitive appearance of the season as a substitute for Mads Roerslev after 72 minutes of a 4–1 FA Cup fourth round defeat to Everton on 5 February 2022. Dasilva was sent off on his fourth league appearance on 26 February and a hamstring injury suffered while suspended saw him miss a further seven weeks. He played the remainder of the season in a substitute role and ended the campaign with 10 appearances.

2022–23 
Following off-season training with a personal coach, alongside former Arsenal teammate Marcus McGuane, Dasilva returned fully fit for the 2022–23 season and scored in each of his first two appearances of the regular season.

International career 
Dasilva was a part of the England U19 squad which won the 2017 UEFA European U19 Championship and made three appearances in the tournament. He appeared in each match of the U20 team's 2017–18 Under 20 Elite League campaign and was a late inclusion in the squad for the 2019 Toulon Tournament. Dasilva won five caps and scored one goal for England at U21 level, all in 2021 UEFA European U21 Championship qualifying matches. In February 2020, Dasilva stated that he would be open to playing for Angola.

Personal life 
Dasilva is of Angolan descent. He attended Beal High School in Redbridge, London.

Career statistics

Honours
England U19
UEFA European U19 Championship: 2017

References

External links

Josh Dasilva at brentfordfc.com
Josh Dasilva at arsenal.com

Josh Dasilva at The Football Association

1998 births
Footballers from Ilford
Living people
English footballers
Arsenal F.C. players
Association football midfielders
England youth international footballers
Brentford F.C. players
English people of Angolan descent
Black British sportspeople
England under-21 international footballers
English Football League players
Premier League players